EIR may refer to:
 Effective interest rate, a banking term
 Entrepreneur In Residence or Executive In Residence, a term in venture capital and business education
 Environmental Information Regulations 2004, a UK Statutory Instrument
 Equipment Identity Register, in a Network Switching Subsystem
 Extended information rate, burstable bandwidth in a Frame Relay network
 Establishment Inspection Report, the result of an investigation by the US FDA.
 Environmental Impact Report, see Environmental impact assessment
 Executive Intelligence Review, the flagship publication of the LaRouche movement
 Kodak Ektachrome Professional Infrared/EIR film, a type of Color Infrared film
 Ethniko Idryma Radiofonias, the National Radio Foundation of Greece
 East Indian Railway Company, introduced railways to eastern and northern India, later known as East Indian Railway (EIR)
 East Indian rosewood, one of the common names for Dalbergia latifolia and its hardwood

Eir may refer to
 Eir, a goddess in Norse mythology
 Eir (telecommunications), a major provider of telecommunications in Ireland
 Eir, a Spivak pronoun
 Eir, a character from the mobile video game Fire Emblem Heroes
 Eir Aoi, Japanese singer

See also
 Eire
 EIRS